"Timelash" is the eighteenth episode aired of the first series of UFO, a 1970 British television science fiction series about an alien invasion of Earth. The screenplay was written by Terence Feely and the director was Cyril Frankel. The episode was filmed from 24 July to 6 August 1970, and aired on ATV Midlands on 17 February 1971. Though shown as the eighteenth episode, it was actually the twenty-fourth to have been filmed.

The series was created by Gerry Anderson and Sylvia Anderson with Reg Hill, and produced by the Andersons and Lew Grade's Century 21 Productions for Grade's ITC Entertainment company.

Story
In the pre-title sequence, Commander Straker appears to go berserk, smashing equipment in SHADO Headquarters. After a brief chase he is restrained and found to have a hypodermic needle and an ampoule of an unidentified drug on his person. Col. Lake is found unconscious on the roof, while on the studio backlot a man's dead body is found in a mini-car. Dr. Jackson subjects Straker to hypnosis, during which he relates the rest of the episode in flashback to Jackson and Paul Foster.

Straker and Lake are attacked by a UFO whilst en route to Headquarters. As they pass through the outer checkpoint, night mysteriously turns into day; they find everyone and everything, both on the studio lots and inside SHADO HQ, frozen in time. The effect begins to overtake them as well. In order to counter it, they inject themselves with potentially life-threatening doses of an experimental stimulant.

Inside SHADO HQ they encounter Turner, a SHADO operative who is working for the aliens. He has placed a device in the HQ that freezes time on Earth and allows a UFO to approach the planet undetected. Straker and Lake attempt to kill Turner but he is able to manipulate time to avoid their attacks.

The UFO is waiting for time to unfreeze in order to attack SHADO HQ. Straker arms himself with a shoulder-fired missile to destroy it. However, Turner ambushes the pair, knocking Lake unconscious and stealing a key required to operate the missile. Straker hunts down Turner, chasing him in mini-cars through the studio lot. Turner tells Straker he cannot shoot him, for he is never where Straker sees him to be. To counter this, Straker - reasoning that Turner must still be nearby - shoots in a wide arc, hoping that at least one bullet will find its mark. He thereby kills Turner, gets the missile key, and destroys the incoming UFO; returning to HQ he begins smashing pieces of equipment, hoping to destroy Turner's device. By now the drug has made him paranoid, and he continues his destructive spree even after he succeeds and time unfreezes.

The story returns to the present. Jackson and Foster allow Straker to rest, while musing on the nature of time.

Errors
 Just as in the Space: 1999 episode "One Moment of Humanity", actors who are portraying "frozen" characters sometimes move.

Cast

Starring
 Ed Bishop — Col. Edward "Ed" Straker, Commander-in-chief of SHADO
 Michael Billington — Col. Paul J. Foster
 Wanda Ventham — Col. Virginia Lake
 Dolores Mantez — Lt. Nina Barry
 Keith Alexander — Lt. Keith Ford
 Ayshea — Lt. Ayshea Johnson
 Vladek Sheybal — Dr. Douglas Jackson
 Norma Ronald — Miss Ealand

Featuring
 Grant Taylor — Gen. James L. Henderson, President of IAC
 Patrick Allen — Turner

Other cast
 Ron Pember — Casting agent
 Kirsten Lindholm — Actress		
 Jean Vladon — Actor	
 Douglas Nottage — SHADO maintenance engineer	
 John Lyons — Studio guard	
 John C. Carney — Studio security guard

Production notes
Locations used for the filming included Neptune House at ATV Elstree Studios, Borehamwood.

The giant chess pieces which feature in the chase sequence were originally made for 1967 film Deadlier Than the Male.

References

External links

1971 British television episodes
UFO (TV series) episodes